Uhogua is a populated town and is located in Ovia North-East Local Government Area in Edo State, Nigeria.

Notable people
 Oba of Benin.
 HRH Osagumwenro Eki-Eresoyen, Enogie of Uhogua Dukedom.

References

Populated places in Edo State